Fremont Canyon is a stream and a deep valley or canyon that runs from its mouth at its confluence with Coyote Creek at the head of Fremont Wash in Iron County, Utah, eastward across the Tushar Mountains to its head at  on the west side of Fremont Pass in Garfield County, Utah.

The Canyon was named for John C. Frémont.

References

Landforms of Iron County, Utah
Canyons and gorges of Garfield County, Utah
Canyons and gorges of Utah